They Only Come Out at Night is the debut studio album by American rock band the Edgar Winter Group. A commercial success, the album reached the #3 on the US Billboard 200 chart and features two of the band's signature songs, "Frankenstein" and "Free Ride". The album was certified gold on April 30, 1973 and platinum on November 21, 1986 by the RIAA. The single "Frankenstein" was certified gold June 19, 1973 by the RIAA. In Canada, the album reached #4 on 2 separate occasions - May 5 and June 16, totaling 14 weeks in the top 10. The third single, "Hangin' Around", reached #39 in the singles chart.

Overview
Recording for the first time as The Edgar Winter Group, Winter assembled an all-star lineup which featured himself, songwriter and multi-instrumentalist Dan Hartman, San Francisco guitarist Ronnie Montrose, and producer/guitarist Rick Derringer, with Eagles' producer Bill Szymczyk serving as technical director.

Montrose had recently left Van Morrison's band and didn't view himself as a rock guitarist when he joined The Edgar Winter Group. "(Winter) so much wanted to do that whole rock thing that he encouraged me," said the guitarist. "I was in the Edgar Winter Group, and I had better start delivering this heavy guitar music. Now. Because I hadn't done that before."

Only twenty-one years old when the album was recorded, Hartman was a child prodigy who had played with Winter's brother Johnny in the past. Hartman wrote or co-wrote six of the album's ten tracks while also contributing vocals, electric and acoustic guitar, ukulele, bass, maracas, and percussion. "Dan was a true genius and a musical visionary", said Winter. "The group would never have been the same without Dan."

"Free Ride" was chosen by Winter as the album's first single. Though it fared poorly initially, it  became a hit after the followup single "Frankenstein" went to #1 on the singles chart. Hartman had written "Free Ride" before  joining Winter's band, and it is Hartman who plays the song's signature opening guitar chords. "I've never heard anybody play it with exactly the same feel as Dan", Winter has said. Two guitar solos are played simultaneously by Montrose on the song in an attempt to get an Eric Clapton feel.

The main riff of "Frankenstein" originated when Winter was playing with his brother Johnny in the late 1960s, and the song developed as a live staple. "I wanted an instrumental that I could use as a showcase. I thought of myself as an instrumentalist, not as a singer", Winter said. From that riff, the song developed into a jam in which Winter improvised a dual drum solo with drummer Red Turner. The song was played live many times before Winter ever considered recording it. "We played that song all over the world and then completely forgot about it. I didn't think of it for years", he said. Initially known simply as "The Instrumental", the band warmed up each day in the studio by playing the song. During the album sessions, it was producer Rick Derringer who convinced Winter to try to turn it into "something that would be usable" for inclusion on the album. Winter recalls that editing the song in the studio was a chore, with audiotape "lying all over the control room". "(It was) draped over the backs of chairs and overflowing the console and the couch. And we were trying to figure out how to put it all back together." The song obtained its title during recording when drummer Chuck Ruff heard a rough mix and said "Wow, man, it's like Frankenstein." "As soon as I heard 'Frankenstein', the monster was born", Winter recalled.

Track listing

Personnel

The Edgar Winter Group 
Edgar Winter – organ, ARP 2600 synthesizer, piano, clavinet, marimba, saxophone, timbales, lead and backing vocals, liner notes
Rick Derringer –  slide guitar, pedal steel guitar, bass, backing vocals, claves, producer
Dan Hartman – bass, rhythm guitar, ukulele, percussion, maracas, lead vocals on Free Ride, backing vocals
Chuck Ruff – drums, congas, vocals

Additional personnel 
Ronnie Montrose – lead guitar, 12 string guitar, mandolin
Randy Jo Hobbs – bass on "Free Ride" and "We All Had a Real Good Time"
Johnny Badanjek – drums on "Free Ride" and "We All Had a Real Good Time"

Technical 
Bill Szymczyk – technical director
Harry Maslin – engineer, Hit Factory Studios
Steve Paul – organic director

Notes

External links
 
 

1972 albums
Albums produced by Rick Derringer
Edgar Winter albums
Epic Records albums